Chandra Shekhar is an Indian politician and member of the Bharatiya Janata Party. Shekhar is a member of the Uttarakhand Legislative Assembly from the Jwalapur constituency in Haridwar district.

References 

People from Haridwar district
Bharatiya Janata Party politicians from Uttarakhand
Members of the Uttarakhand Legislative Assembly
Living people
21st-century Indian politicians
Year of birth missing (living people)